Upper Tanana (also known as Tabesna, Nabesna or Nee'aanèegn') is an endangered Athabaskan language spoken in eastern Interior Alaska, United States, mainly in the villages of Northway, Tetlin, and Tok, and adjacent areas of the Canadian territory of Yukon. In 2000 there were fewer than 100 speakers, and the language was no longer being acquired by children.

Overview 
Upper Tanana shows near mutual-intelligibility with neighboring Tanacross but differs in several phonological features. In particular, Upper Tanana has low tone as a reflex of Proto-Athabaskan constriction, where Tanacross has high tone. Upper Tanana also has an extra vowel phoneme and has developed diphthongs through loss of final consonants.

Traditionally, five main dialects have been recognized.

The main Upper Tanana speaking communities today are located in the Alaskan communities of Northway and Tetlin and in the Canadian community of Beaver Creek.

Name 
There are actually two Tanana languages, the first being Lower Tanana, or Minto, and the second being Upper Tanana, or Nabesna.

Language today 
As of the beginning of the 21st century, roughly 100 people still speak the language. The demographic make up of the Upper Tanana speakers are above the age 60. The language is no longer taught to children of this current generation, therefore, the extinction of Upper Tanana is in the near future. In the 1960s, Paul G. Milanowski and Alfred John worked together to establish a writing system to produce several booklets and school dictionaries to assist in bilingual programs.

Geography 
Upper Tanana is the eastern part of Alaska that also shares the same location as the speakers of the Tanacross Language. This location reaches from the Wrangell Mountain range across to Joseph Creek, and west of the Tanana rivers. The Tanana Rivers divides this area through a string of smaller rivers and creeks. Upper Tanana is mainly spoken in Tetlin and Northway.

Dialects 
Upper Tanana is categorised into five separate dialects. The first dialect is spoken by the Tetlin band, which has up to 20 known speakers. The other four dialect are spoken by the smaller bands that are located more upriver. The first is Nabesna with two known speakers, the second dialect is Northway with 20 known speakers, the third dialect is Scottie Creek which no longer has any known speakers, and the last is Beaver Creek dialect has one known speaker, but there is a high potential for a few more.

Official status 
The state of Alaska recognized Upper Tanana, along with 19 other native Alaskan languages, as one of the official languages of the state in 2014.

Phonology 
The Upper Tanana writing system consists of 13 vowels, 34 consonants, and five tones.

Consonants

Vowels

Tone 
The Upper Tanana has a range of five separate tones.

Vocabulary 
Examples of words translated from English to Upper Tanana.

External links
 Yukon Native Language Centre - Upper Tanana
 Alaska Native Language Center
 Upper Tanana basic lexicon at the Global Lexicostatistical Database

References

 Haynes, Terry L., and William E. Simeone. Upper Tanana Ethnographic Overview and Assessment, Wrangell St. Elias National Park and Preserve. Juneau, AK: Alaska Dept. of Fish and Game, Division of Subsistence, 2007. Print.
 Heinrich, Albert. 1957. Sib and Social Structure on the Upper Tanana. Science in Alaska: Proceedings of the 8th Alaskan Science Conference, 10-22. Anchorage: American Association for the Advancement of Science.
 John, Bessie. 1997. Nee'aaneek: Upper Tanana Glossary, Scottie Creek Dialect. Beaver Creek, Yukon: Upper Tanana Cultural Society.
 McKennan, Robert A. 1959. The Upper Tanana Indians. (Yale University Publications in Anthropology 55). New Haven: Yale University Department of Anthropology.
 Milanowski, Paul G. & John,  Alfred. 1979. Nee'aaneegn'. Upper Tanana (Tetlin) Junior Dictionary. Anchorage: National Bilingual Materials Development Center.
 Minoura, Nobukatsu. 1994. A Comparative Phonology of the Upper Tanana Athabaskan Dialects. Languages of the North Pacific Rim, ed. by Miyaoka, Osahito. pp. 159–96. (Hokkaido University Publications in Linguistics 7.). Sapporo: Department of Linguistics, Faculty of Letters, Hokkaido University.
 Minoura, Nobukatsu. 1997. A Note on Possessive Construction in Upper Tanana Athabaskan. Studies in Possessive Expressions, ed. by Hayasi, Tooru & Bhaskararao, Peri. pp. 177–96. Tokyo: Institute for the Study of Languages and Cultures of Asia and Africa, Tokyo University of Foreign Studies.
 Sam, Avis. 1999. Upper Tanana Athabaskan Language Lessons. Whitehorse: Yukon Native Language Centre
 Shinkwin, Anne D., Aigner Jean S. & Andrews, Elizabeth. 1980. Land Use Patterns in the Upper Tanana Valley, Alaska. Anthropological Papers of the University of Alaska 19(2).43-53.
Tuttle, Siri G.; Lovick, Olga; Núñez-Ortiz, Isabel. 2011. Vowels of Upper Tanana Athabascan. Journal of the International Phonetic Association. Vol. 41, No. 3, pp. 283-312
 Tyone, Mary. 1996. Ttheek'adn Ut'iin Yaaniida' Oonign' (Old Time Stories of the Scottie Creek People). Fairbanks: Alaska Native Language Center.

Dictionaries 

Tanana Athabaskans
Northern Athabaskan languages
Indigenous languages of Alaska
Indigenous languages of the North American Subarctic
Endangered Dené–Yeniseian languages
Official languages of Alaska